One Direction are an English-Irish boy band consisting of members Niall Horan, Liam Payne, Harry Styles and Louis Tomlinson. In addition, Zayn Malik was a member until his departure from the band, announced on 25 March 2015. One Direction have released five albums, Up All Night (2011), Take Me Home (2012), Midnight Memories (2013), Four (2014), and Made in the A.M. (2015). The band has won numerous awards, among them six Billboard Music Awards, seven Brit Awards, seven American Music Awards and 28 Teen Choice Awards.

4Music Video Honours
The Music Video Honours is an Annual music awards show by 4Music, a music and entertainment channel in the United Kingdom and available on some digital television providers in the Republic of Ireland. One Direction have received eight awards out of eight nominations.

American Music Awards
The American Music Awards, (AMA) is an annual American music awards show, created by Dick Clark in 1973 for ABC when the network's contract to present the Grammy Awards expired. Unlike the Grammys, which are awarded on the basis of votes by members of the Recording Academy, the AMAs are determined by a poll of the public and music buyers. One Direction have won seven out of ten awards.

ARIA Music Awards
The Australian Recording Industry Association Music Awards (commonly known as ARIA Music Awards or ARIA Awards) is an annual series of awards nights celebrating the Australian music industry, put on by the Australian Recording Industry Association (ARIA). One Direction have received five awards of the nominations.

Bambi Awards
The Bambi, often simply called Bambi Awards and stylised as BAMBI, are presented annually by Hubert Burda Media to recognize excellence in international media and television "with vision and creativity who affected and inspired the German public that year," both domestic and foreign. One Direction have won one award.

BBC Radio 1 Teen Awards
The BBC Radio 1 Teen Awards is an award show by the British radio station BBC Radio 1 to honor the top artists in music and acting of the year. One Direction have won seven awards out of nine nominations.

Billboard Music Awards
The Billboard Music Awards is an honor given by Billboard, the preeminent publication covering the music business. The Billboard Music Awards show had been held annually in December until it went dormant in 2007, but it returned in May 2011. One Direction have won six awards out of seventeen nominations.

Billboard Touring Awards
Billboard honours the industry's top artists, venues and professionals of the year at the annual Billboard Touring Awards reception. These awards are based primarily on the Billboard Boxscore chart, recognizing true box office success and industry achievement. One Direction won five awards out of six nominations.

Bravo Otto
The Bravo Otto is an award show by the German teen magazine Bravo to honor the top artists in music, acting and sports of the year. The award is presented in gold, silver and bronze and, since 1996, an honorary platinum statuette presented for lifetime achievement. One Direction have received five awards out of five nominations.

Brit Awards
The Brit Awards are the British Phonographic Industry's annual pop music awards. One Direction have received seven awards out of twelve nominations.

Canadian Radio Music Awards
The Canadian Radio Music Awards are an annual series of awards presented by the Canadian Association of Broadcasters that are part of Canadian Music Week.

Do Something Awards
The Do Something Awards culminated in 1996 to recognize young people under the age of 25 who have done outstanding work in their communities and the world. The awards include both young people involved in activism and individuals from the entertainment industry who have dedicated their time to activism and charity. One Direction have received one nomination.

FiFi Awards
The FiFi Awards are an annual event sponsored by The Fragrance Foundation which honor the fragrance industry's creative achievements and is the most prominent and prestigious celebratory event of the fragrance industry. One Direction have received two nominations.

Golden Trailer Awards
The Golden Trailer Awards is an annual awards show that honors achievements in motion picture marketing, including film trailers, posters and television advertisements. One Direction have received one nomination.

International Dance Music Awards
The International Dance Music Awards are held annually as part of the Winter Music Conference. One Direction has received a nomination.

IFPI Global Recording Artist Award
IFPI published its first Global Recording Artist of the Year on 30 January 2014 to accurately capture the popularity of artists across streaming channels, alongside digital and physical album and singles sales the previous year.
The independently verified chart included sales of albums - across digital, CD and vinyl formats; singles, both downloaded and physical; on-demand streams and music videos. The chart included all the music of each artist featured, not just one track or album. It used track and album equivalents to combine measurements of downloads, physical sales and streams. One Direction have collected their award after being named the IFPI Global Recording Artist of 2013. The award, which honours the most popular act globally across downloading, streaming and physical format sales, was presented by IFPI's chief executive Frances Moore.

iHeartRadio Music Awards
The iHeartRadio Music Awards held their first ever ceremony on 1 May 2014. It is fan-voted.

Japan Gold Disc Awards
The Japan Gold Disc Awards (日本ゴールドディスク大賞) for Music sales in the Recording Industry Association of Japan, is major music awards held annually in Japan also released as a CD. One Direction have received eight awards out of eight nominations.

JIM Awards
The JIM Awards (also "Jimmies") are an annual awards show presented by the Flemish TV channel JIM. One Direction have received five awards out of seven nominations.

Juno Awards
The Juno Awards are presented annually to Canadian musical artists and bands to acknowledge their artistic and technical achievements in all aspects of music. New members of the Canadian Music Hall of Fame are also inducted as part of the awards ceremonies. One Direction have received three nominations.

Kerrang! Awards
The Kerrang! Awards is an annual music awards show in the United Kingdom, founded by the music magazine, Kerrang!. One Direction have received a nomination.

Los Premios 40 Principales
Los Premios 40 Principales, is an award show by the Spanish musical radio station Los 40 Principales. Created in 2006 to celebrate the fortieth anniversary of the founding of the worldwide station. From 2012 the American national categories were declared extinct and Los Premios 40 Principales America were created in their place as a separate show from the one in Spain.

Los Premios 40 Principales España
For the Spanish version, One Direction have received four awards out of seven nominations.

Los Premios 40 Principales América
For the American version, One Direction have received two awards out of three nominations.

MTV Awards

MTV Europe Music Awards
The MTV Europe Music Awards (EMA) were established in 1994 by MTV Networks Europe to celebrate the most popular music videos in Europe. One Direction received twelve awards out of their sixteen nominations; three out of four in 2012, four out of six in 2013, and five out of six in 2014.

MTV Video Music Awards
The American MTV Video Music Awards (VMAs) is an award show by the cable network MTV to honor the top music videos of the year. It was first held at the end of the summer of 1984, and originally as an alternative to the Grammy Award in the video category. One Direction have won four awards out of four nominations.

MTV Video Music Awards Brazil
The MTV Video Music Brazil awards (originally Video Music Awards Brazil), more commonly known as VMB, are MTV Brasil's annual award ceremony, established in 1995. MTV viewers pick the winners for most categories since 2001. One Direction have received one award out of one nomination.

MTV Video Music Awards Japan
The MTV Video Music Awards Japan are the Japanese version of the MTV Video Music Awards. One Direction have received five nominations.

MTV Music Awards Italy
The MTV Music Awards Italy are an annual award ceremony hosted by MTV Italy. The ceremony awards the best video, performers, and artists of the year. One Direction have received five awards out of eight nominations.

MuchMusic Video Awards
The MuchMusic Video Awards is an annual awards ceremony presented by the Canadian music video channel MuchMusic. One Direction have won one award out of six nominations.

Myx Music Awards
The Myx Music Awards honor the biggest hitmakers in the Philippines. One Direction have received one award out of four nominations.

Neox Fan Awards 
The Neox Fan Awards were created by Atresmedia for teenage audiences to honor the best of the year in television, music, sports and films. One Direction has been nominated once

Nickelodeon Kids' Choice Awards

Nickelodeon Kids' Choice Awards USA

Nickelodeon Kids' Choice Awards Argentina
For the Kids' Choice Awards Argentina, One Direction have received one award out of two nominations.

Nickelodeon Kids' Choice Awards Australia
For the Nickelodeon Australian Kids' Choice Awards, One Direction have received two awards out of three nominations.

Meus Prêmios Nick
For the Meus Prêmios Nick, One Direction have received two awards out of seven nominations.

Nickelodeon Kids' Choice Awards Colombia
The Kids' Choice Awards Colombia is the Colombian edition of Nickelodeon's Kids Choice Awards, held in Bogota.

Nickelodeon Mexico Kids' Choice Awards
For the Nickelodeon Mexico Kids' Choice Awards, One Direction have won five awards out of seven nominations.

Nickelodeon UK Kids' Choice Awards
For the Nickelodeon UK Kids' Choice Awards, One Direction have won four awards out of four nominations.

NewNowNext Awards
The NewNowNext Awards is an American annual entertainment awards show, presented by the lesbian, gay, bisexual and transgender-themed channel Logo. One Direction has won an award.

NME Awards
The NME Awards is an annual music awards show in the United Kingdom, founded by the music magazine NME (New Musical Express). One Direction have received two awards out of five nominations.

NRJ Music Awards
The NRJ Music Awards, created in 2000 by the radio station NRJ in partnership with the television network TF1, takes place every year in mid-January at Cannes (PACA, France) as the opening of MIDEM (Marché international de l'édition musicale). They give out awards to popular musicians by different categories. One Direction have received four awards out of four nominations.

O Music Awards
The O Music Awards (commonly abbreviated as OMAs) is an awards show presented by Viacom to honor music, technology and the intersection between the two. One Direction have received a nomination.

People's Choice Awards
The People's Choice Awards is an American awards show recognizing the people and the work of popular culture. The show has been held annually since 1975 and is voted on by the general public. One Direction have received three awards out of eight nominations.

Pollstar Awards
The Pollstar Awards is an annual award ceremony to honor artists and professionals in the concert industry held by "Pollstar".

Popjustice's Twenty Quid Music Prize 
The Popjustice £20 Music Prize, also known as the Popjustice Twenty Quid Prize, is an annual prize awarded by music website Popjustice to recognise the best British pop single of the previous year. The prize was conceived by Popjustice founder Peter Robinson in 2003 as a reaction to what he perceived as the pompous and elitist nature of the existing Mercury Prize, which recognises the best album of the previous year, and in particular its exclusion of pop music acts in favour of those from more esoteric genres. The shortlist for the Popjustice prize is announced in September of each year and the winner named the following month, to coincide with the presentation of the Mercury Prize. Popjustice gives a token prize of £20 to the winner of its award, in contrast to the £20,000 given to the winner of the Mercury Prize.

Premios Oye!
The Premios Oye! (Premio Nacional a la Música Grabada) are presented annually by the Academia Nacional de la Música en México for outstanding achievements in the Mexican record industry.

Pure Beauty Awards
The Pure Beauty Awards celebrates the best in beauty – the most efficacious, exciting and innovative products launched over the past 12 months.

Radio Disney Music Awards
The Radio Disney Music Awards is an annual awards show which is operated and governed by Radio Disney, an American radio network. One Direction have won four out of thirteen awards.

Rockbjörnen
Rockbjörnen is a music prize in Sweden, divided into several categories, which is awarded annually by the newspaper Aftonbladet. The prize was first awarded in 1979, and is mostly centered on pop and rock.

Shorty Awards
The Shorty Awards, also known as the Shorties, are an annual awards event that honors the best short-form content creators on the micro-blogging website Twitter and on other social media sites.

Teen Choice Awards
The Teen Choice Awards were established in 1999 to honor the year's biggest achievements in music, movies, sports and television, being voted by young people aged between 13 and 19. One Direction have won 28 out of the 31 awards that for which they have been nominated. They currently hold the record for most Teen Choice Awards.

Telehit Awards
The Telehit Awards are an annual award show. One Direction have won nine awards out of nine nominations.

UK Music Video Awards
The UK Music Video Awards is an annual celebration of creativity, technical excellence and innovation in music video and moving image for music. One Direction have one nomination.

United By Pop Awards
The United By Pop Awards is an annual fan-voted digital event which takes place on UnitedbyPop.com

World Music Awards
The World Music Awards is an international awards show founded in 1989 that annually honors recording artists based on worldwide sales figures provided by the International Federation of the Phonographic Industry (IFPI). One Direction have received four awards out of five nominations.

Young Hollywood Awards
The Young Hollywood Awards is an annual award event that took place since 1999, honoring promising and up-and-coming stars in Hollywood.

Youth Rock Awards
The annual Youth Rock Awards founded by JG Entertainment, that honors artists that are twenty-five years old or under and excel in dance, music or acting. One Direction won one award.

YouTube Music Awards
The YouTube Music Awards, abbreviated as the YTMA, was the inaugural music award show presented by YouTube.

References

Awards and nominations
Lists of awards received by British musician
Lists of awards received by Irish musician
Lists of awards received by musical group